The Central Suburban Conference was an IHSAA-sanctioned conference from 1971 to 1997. The conference can be considered a continuation of the Capital District Conference, as almost all of the schools involved in that conference during the 1970–71 school year became charter members of the CSC that next year. By the early 1990s, the conference had dwindled to five large schools located in suburban Indianapolis. As class basketball was set to be introduced in the 1997–98 school year, the Central Suburban and South Central conferences, as well as large independent schools, decided to reorganize, giving way to Conference Indiana and the Metropolitan Interscholastic Conference. The Central Suburban can be considered a predecessor to Conference Indiana, as all but one school became part of that conference.

Schools

Resources 
 Almanac Sports- Central Suburban Conference

Indiana high school athletic conferences
High school sports conferences and leagues in the United States
Sports competitions in Indianapolis
Indiana High School Athletic Association disestablished conferences